Charles Ferris Booher (January 31, 1848 – January 21, 1921) was a U.S. Representative from Missouri.

Born on a farm near East Groveland, New York, Booher attended the common schools and the Geneseo Academy, Geneseo, New York.
He taught school and studied law.
He was admitted to the bar in 1871 and commenced practice in Rochester, Missouri.
He moved to Savannah, Missouri, in 1875, having been appointed prosecuting attorney of Andrew County, in which capacity he served until 1877, and again from 1883 to 1885.
He resumed the practice of law in Savannah, Missouri, and also, in 1888, engaged in the loan and real estate business.
He served as mayor of Savannah, Missouri from 1886 to 1890.

Booher was elected as a Democrat to the Fiftieth Congress in the special election to fill the vacancy caused by the death of James N. Burnes and served from (February 19, 1889 – March 3, 1889).
He was not a candidate for election for the full term.

Booher was elected to the Sixtieth Congress and to the six subsequent Congresses (March 4, 1907 – January 21, 1921).
He was not a candidate for renomination in 1920.
He died on January 21, 1921, in Savannah, Missouri.
He was interred in City Cemetery, Savannah, Missouri.

See also
List of United States Congress members who died in office (1900–49)

References

Charles F. Booher, late a representative from Missouri, Memorial addresses delivered in the House of Representatives and Senate frontispiece 1922

1848 births
1921 deaths
Democratic Party members of the United States House of Representatives from Missouri
People from Andrew County, Missouri
Mayors of places in Missouri
People from Groveland, New York
People from Savannah, Missouri